Fairmount Cemetery in Denver, Colorado, was founded in 1890 and is Denver's second oldest operating cemetery after Riverside Cemetery. It is located in land south-east of the intersection of the major Denver roadways Alameda Ave. and Quebec St. (originally called Hyde Park Avenue). The cemetery was designed by German landscape architect Reinhard Schuetze. The cemetery was patterned after Mount Auburn Cemetery in Boston.  The cemetery is 280 acres. The first year the cemetery opened over 4500 trees and shrubs were planted by Schuetze. The cemetery is the largest arboretum in the state.

The cemetery contains many fine monuments, including works by Robert Garrison, John Paulding, Arnold Ronnebeck, Pompeo Coppini and others.

The cemetery also contains three structures which have been designated as official historic landmarks by the City of Denver: the Little Ivy Chapel, the Gate Lodge, and the Fairmount Mausoleum. The Little Ivy Chapel and the Gate Lodge were both constructed in 1890, the year the cemetery opened, and were designed by architect Henry Ten Eyck Wendell. The Fairmount Mausoleum, constructed in 1929 and opened in 1930, was designed by architects Frederick E. Mountjoy and Francis W. Frewan.

Notable burials
 Gordon Llewellyn Allott (1907–1989), US Senator
 Elias Milton Ammons (1860–1925), Colorado Governor
 Teller Ammons (1895–1972),  Colorado Governor
 Priscilla Baird (1828–1904), founder of Baird College
 William J. Barker (died 1911), Denver Mayor
 
 Lou Blonger (1849–1924), Saloonkeeper, gambling house owner and kingpin of Denver underworld
 Charles Boettcher (1852–1948), Businessman, philanthropist
 Frederick Gilmer Bonfils (1860–1933), co-founder of the Denver Post
 Nona L. Brooks (1861–1945), leader in the New Thought movement and a founder of the Church of Divine Science.
 William C. Bryan (1852–1933), Indian Wars Medal of Honor Recipient
 Henry Augustus Buchtel (1847–1924), Colorado Governor
 Temple Hoyne Buell (1895–1990), Architect
 William Evans Burney (1893–1969), US Representative from Colorado
 William Newton Byers (1831–1903), founder and editor of the Rocky Mountain News in Denver, Colorado
 Lewis Cass Carpenter (1836–1908), US Representative from South Carolina
 
 Ralph Lawrence Carr (1887–1950), Colorado Governor
 John Milton Chivington (1821–1894), Methodist pastor and Union Army colonel, responsible for Sand Creek massacre
 George Washington Cook (1851–1916), US Representative from Colorado
 Job Adams Cooper (1843–1899), Colorado Governor
 Edward Prentiss Costigan (1874–1939), US Senator
 Peter Hoyt Dominick (1915–1981), US Representative from Colorado, US Senator
 Stephen Wallace Dorsey (1842–1916), US Senator from Arkansas
 Major Jacob Downing (1830–1907), Lawyer, Civil War Officer
 William Robb Eaton (1877–1942), US Representative from Colorado
 Frank Edbrooke (1840–1921), leading architect in Denver
 John Elitch (1851–1891), founder of Elitch Gardens
 Mary Elitch Long (1856–1936), co founder of Elitch Gardens
 Justina Ford (1871–1952), medical pioneer
 Dean Milton Gillespie (1884–1949), US Congressman
 Frank Graham (1914–1950), announcer and voice actor – unmarked 
 James Benton Grant (1848–1911), Colorado Governor
 
 Emily Griffith (1860–1947), founder of Emily Griffith Opportunity School
 LH Guldman,(1852-1936) Pioneer Merchant and Philanthropist
 Julius Caldeen Gunter (1858–1940), Colorado Governor
 Frank Leslie Hagaman  (1894–1966), Kansas Governor
 Warren Armstrong Haggott (1864–1958), US Representative from Colorado
 Irving Hale (1861–1930), founder of Veterans of Foreign Wars
 Moses Hallett (1834–1913), Chief Justice, US District Judge
 Samuel Hartsel (1834–1918), Colorado ranching pioneer
 Nathaniel Peter Hill (1832–1900), US Senator
 Louise Sneed Hill (1862–1955) wife of Crawford Hill, head of the famous Denver society set called the Sacred 36
 Herbert Alonzo Howe  (1858–1926), American astronomer, educator, author, Dean of Denver University
 Robert Lee Howsam (1918–2008), co-founder of the Denver Broncos
 Charles James Hughes Jr. (1853–1911), US Senator
 John Wesley Iliff (1831–1878), prominent cattle rancher
 Byron L. Johnson (1917–2000), US Representative from Colorado
 Edwin Carl 'Big Ed' Johnson (1884–1970), Colorado Governor, US Senator
 Harold Irving Johnston (1892–1949), World War I Medal of Honor Recipient
 
 George John Kindel (1855–1930), US Representative from Colorado
 William Lee Knous (1889–1959), Colorado Governor
 Arlene White Lawrence (1916–1990), Bishop and the third President and General Superintendent of the Pillar of Fire Church
 Eva Frederica French LeFevre (1851–1948), original founder of the Charity Organization Society, one of the first charity movements in the country
 Wolfe Londoner (1842–1912), Denver Mayor
 William Austin Hamilton Loveland (1826–1894), railroad entrepreneur and businessman
 Lieut. Francis Brown Lowry (1894–1918), 91st Aero Squadron pilot killed in World War I, Lowry Field was named in honor of him
 Rice William Means (1877–1949), US Senator
 Donald Meek (1878–1946), popular character actor
 Eugene Donald Millikin (1891–1958), US Senator
 David Halliday Moffat (1839–1911), financier and industrialist
 Ostis Otto Moore (1896–1990), Judge and Chief Justice of the Colorado Supreme Court, Assistant District Attorney for Denver District Attorney's Office
 Clarence J. Morley (1869–1948), Colorado Governor
 Samuel Danford Nicholson (1859–1923), US Senator
 Jackson Orr (1832–1926), US Representative from Colorado
 Thomas MacDonald Patterson (1839–1916), US Representative from Colorado, US Senator
 Lawrence Cowle Phipps (1862–1958), US Senator
 Frederick Pitkin (1837–1886), Colorado Governor
 James H. Platt Jr. (1837–1894), US Representative from Colorado
 Hugh H. Price (1859–1904), US Representative from Colorado
 
 William MacLeod Raine (1871–1954), Western Author
 Robert Sawers Roeschlaub (1843–1923), architect
 Joe Rogers (1964–2013), former Lieutenant Governor of Colorado
 Florence Rena Sabin (1871–1953), American medical scientist
 Karl Cortlandt Schuyler (1877–1933), US Senator
 John Franklin Shafroth (1854–1922), US Representative from Colorado, Colorado Governor, US Senator
 Isaiah Shoels (1980–1999), victim of the Columbine High School massacre
 Jesse Shwayder (1882–1970), Founder of Samsonite Corporation
 Mattie Silks (1846–1929), Famous madam
 Eben Smith (1832–1906), prominent bank, mine and railroad owner.
 Paul Sonnenberg (1848–1909), Vaudeville entertainer known as Paul Stanley
 Anna Speas (1869–1898), Park County woman whose tragic life was examined Historic Tales from Park County: Parked in the Past (unmarked grave)
 Robert W. Speer (1855–1918),  Denver Mayor
 Edward G. Stoiber (1854–1906), mining engineer and owner of the Silver Lakes Mines
 George Gifford Symes (1840–1893), US Representative from Colorado
 Henry Moore Teller (1830–1914), US Senator, Secretary of the Interior between 1882 and 1885.
 Charles Spalding Thomas (1849–1934), Colorado Governor, US Senator
 James H. Turpin (1846–1893), Indian Wars Medal of Honor Recipient
 William Newell Vaile (1876–1927), US Representative from Colorado
 Jasper D. Ward (1829–1902), US Representative from Colorado
 Orlando Ward (1891–1972), US Army Major General
 Henry White Warren (1831–1912), Bishop of Methodist Episcopal Church
 Thomas James Waters (1843–1898), International architect
 Ray Bridwell White (1892–1946), of the Pillar of Fire Church
 Two British Commonwealth war graves, of a Canadian Army officer of World War I and a Royal Artillery soldier of World War II.
 Vasilije Ćuković (1858–1933)

References

External links
 Fairmount Cemetery & Mortuary
 Fairmount Heritage Foundation
 Images of tombstones

Cemeteries in Colorado
1890 establishments in Colorado
Geography of Denver
Protected areas of Denver